Collins Tiego is a Kenyan footballer who plays as a striker. He last played for Uttar Baridhara SC. He also represented the Kenya national football team.

Club career

Uttara Baridhara SC

On 4 May 2014, he scored goal against Brothers Union, and his team Uttar Baridhara Club won the match by 3–2.

References 

1983 births
Living people
Kenyan footballers
Kenya international footballers
Association football forwards
Expatriate footballers in Bangladesh
Posta Rangers F.C. players
Ushuru F.C. players
Nairobi City Stars players
Uttar Baridhara SC players